Guéré (Gere), also called Wè (Wee), is a Kru language spoken by over 300,000 people in the Dix-Huit Montagnes and Moyen-Cavally regions of Ivory Coast.

Phonology
The phonology of Guere (here the Zagna dialect of Central Guere / Southern Wè) is briefly sketched out below.

Consonants
The consonant phonemes are as follows:

Allophones of some of these phonemes include:
  is an allophone of  before nasal vowels
  is an allophone of  before nasal vowels
  is an allophone of  before nasal vowels
  is an allophone of  after a coronal consonant (alveolar or palatal)

Vowels
Like many West African languages, Guere makes use of a contrast between vowels with advanced tongue root and those with retracted tongue root. In addition, nasal vowels contrast phonemically with oral vowels.

Tones
Guere is a tonal language and contrasts ten tones:

See also
Wobe  Northern Wè

References

Wee languages
Languages of Ivory Coast